In mathematics, Shephard's problem, is the following geometrical question asked by Geoffrey Colin Shephard in 1964: if K and L are centrally symmetric convex bodies in n-dimensional Euclidean space such that whenever K and L are projected onto a hyperplane, the volume of the projection of K is smaller than the volume of the projection of L, then does it follow that the volume of K is smaller than that of L?

In this case, "centrally symmetric" means that the reflection of K in the origin, −K, is a translate of K, and similarly for L. If k : Rn → Πk is a projection of Rn onto some k-dimensional hyperplane Πk (not necessarily a coordinate hyperplane) and Vk denotes k-dimensional volume, Shephard's problem is to determine the truth or falsity of the implication

Vk(k(K)) is sometimes known as the brightness of K and the function Vk o k as a (k-dimensional) brightness function.

In dimensions n = 1 and 2, the answer to Shephard's problem is "yes". In 1967, however, Petty and Schneider showed that the answer is "no" for every n ≥ 3. The solution of Shephard's problem requires Minkowski's first inequality for convex bodies and the notion of  projection bodies of convex bodies.

See also
Busemann–Petty problem

Notes

References
 

 

Convex geometry
Convex analysis